Owen Wijndal (born 28 November 1999) is a Dutch professional footballer who plays as a left-back for Eredivisie club Ajax and the Netherlands national team.

Club career

AZ
Born in Paramaribo, Wijndal joined the AZ youth academy at the age of 10, having formerly played for local sides ZVV Zaandijk and HFC Haarlem. He was promoted to the second team for the 2016–17 season playing in the third-tier Tweede Divisie. On 4 February 2017, Wijndal made his first-team debut for AZ, starting in a 2–4 home loss to PSV Eindhoven in the Eredivisie due to injuries to regular starter Ridgeciano Haps and backup Thomas Ouwejan. The end of the 2016–17 season saw AZ end on sixth place and thereby qualifying for domestic play-offs for participation in the third qualifying round of the Europa League the following season. They eventually missed out on European football, losing to FC Utrecht on penalties after two legs. That season, Wijndal also made 24 league appearances for the reserves in the third division, helping them win the third division title and thereby reach promotion to the second tier of Dutch football.

During the 2017–18 season, Wijndal featured in the first-team side more regularly, making seven league appearances. For the newly promoted reserves, he made 16 appearances and scoring two goals. At the end of the season he signed a new five-year deal with AZ on 22 June 2018. After struggling to break into the first team during the 2018–19 season, he began playing as a regular starter during the 2019–20 season. On 25 July 2019, Wijndal also made his debut in the Europa League in a 0–0 home draw against Swedish club BK Häcken. He scored his first professional goal on 7 March 2020 in a 4–0 league win over ADO Den Haag.

Ahead of the 2021–22 season, Wijndal was made captain of AZ following the departure of Teun Koopmeiners.

Ajax
On 12 July 2022, he joined Eredivisie club Ajax from AZ on a five-year deal for €10 million.

International career
Born in the Suriname to a Dutch father and Surinamese mother. Wijndal is eligible for both Suriname and Netherlands.  He has represented the Netherlands at every age group from under-15 to under-21 level. Between 2015 and 2016, he made 12 appearances for the Netherlands under-17 team, and participated in the 2016 UEFA European Under-17 Championship in Azerbaijan where he made five appearances. The Dutch team made the semi-finals, where they stranded against Portugal.

Wijndal was a regular starter for the Netherlands under-19 team between 2016 and 2018, making 16 appearances for the team. In the same period, he also appeared for the Netherlands under-20 team. On 31 May 2019, Wijndal made his debut for the Netherlands under-21 team in a friendly match against Mexico in Doetinchem that ended in a 5–1 win for the Dutch.

Wijndal was called up to the senior Netherlands squad for the UEFA Nations League matches against Poland and Italy in September 2020.

On 7 October 2020, he made his first appearance for the Netherlands in the friendly match against Mexico which Mexico won 1–0.

Career statistics

Club

International

Honours
Individual
Eredivisie Talent of the Month: August 2019; November 2019; November 2020; December 2020
 Eredivisie Player of the Month: May 2021

References

External links 
 Profile at the AFC Ajax website
 

1999 births
Living people
Sportspeople from Paramaribo
Dutch footballers
Association football defenders
Netherlands international footballers
Netherlands under-21 international footballers
Netherlands youth international footballers
Dutch sportspeople of Surinamese descent
Eredivisie players
Eerste Divisie players
HFC Haarlem players
AZ Alkmaar players
Jong AZ players
AFC Ajax players
UEFA Euro 2020 players
Footballers from Zaanstad